Raul Valković (born 2 January 1989) is a Croatian handballer, who plays at centre back player position for RK Umag.

He has also played for Matulji 2001, Trsat, Zamet and Kozala.

Honours
Matulji 2001
2. HRL (West)
Winner (1): 2011-12

References

External links
 Player Info in European competitions
 Player info in Premier league

1989 births
Living people
Croatian male handball players
Handball players from Rijeka
RK Zamet players